Air Vice-Marshal Sir Bernard Albert Chacksfield,  (13 April 1913 – 27 December 1999) was a senior Royal Air Force officer in the 1950s and 1960s and later a chief commissioner of The Scout Association and chairman of the Burma Star Association.

Chacksfield joined the Royal Air Force in 1927 as an apprentice aircraft engineer at RAF Halton and later at RAF Cranwell. He was selected for flying training and gaining a commission as a Pilot Officer in 1933. He served on the North West Frontier in 1933 as a Westland Wapiti pilot. By 1944 Chacksfield was in command of No. 910 Wing in Burma operating the Republic Thunderbolt fighter-bomber. By the end of the war he had been mentioned in despatches four times. From 1945 he became an air officer and served in the Air Ministry and later with NATO. He served in a number of senior positions until finally becoming Commandant-General of the RAF Regiment in 1963. Chacksfield retired in 1968 as an air vice-marshal.

With a longtime interest in the Scout movement he was appointed in 1970 as chief commissioner for the Scout Association later being awarded the movements highest award, the Silver Wolf in 1975. Chacksfield was awarded the Bronze Wolf, the only distinction of the World Organization of the Scout Movement, awarded by the World Scout Committee for exceptional services to world Scouting.

In retirement he became chairman on the Burma Star Association until his death from cancer in 1999.

References

 Oxford Dictionary of National Biography – Sir Bernard Albert Chacksfield
 Air Vice Marshal Sir Bernard Chacksfield (33051)

|-

Royal Air Force air marshals
1913 births
1999 deaths
Companions of the Order of the Bath
Knights Commander of the Order of the British Empire
English aviators
The Scout Association
Royal Air Force personnel of World War II
Trenchard Brats
Recipients of the Bronze Wolf Award
Military personnel from Essex